Amblyseius filicinae is a species of mite in the family Phytoseiidae.

References

filicinae
Articles created by Qbugbot
Animals described in 1998
Taxa named by Wolfgang Karg